Scheurer is a German surname. Notable people with the surname include:

Armin Scheurer (1917–1990), Swiss athlete
Karl Scheurer (1872–1927), Swiss politician
Rudolf Scheurer (1925–2015), Swiss football referee

See also
 Scheuer

German-language surnames